St. Wolstan's Community School is an all-female community school, under the trusteeship of the Catholic Archbishop of Dublin, the Holy Faith Sisters and Kildare and Wicklow Education and Training Board situated in Celbridge, County Kildare, Ireland. It is the only all-girls community school in Ireland.

History
St. Wolstan's Priory was founded between 1202 and 1205 by Adam de Hereford and named after Saint Wolstan (also spelled Wulfstan; died 1095). The monastery was dissolved in 1536 and when the Holy Faith Sisters opened a girls' school  on the site (located south of Castletown House) in 1955 they revived the name: St. Wolstan's Holy Faith Convent School. The school moved to the present site in Ballymakealy Upper in 1999.

References

External links 
 St. Wolstan's Community School

1999 establishments in Ireland
Celbridge
Educational institutions established in 1999
Girls' schools in the Republic of Ireland
Secondary schools in County Kildare
Community schools in the Republic of Ireland